Clivina truncata is a species of ground beetle in the subfamily Scaritinae. It was described by Jules Putzeys in 1877.

References

truncata
Beetles described in 1877